Postjesbuurt or Westindische buurt is a neighbourhood in Amsterdam, Netherlands. Since 2010, it is part of the district of De Baarsjes and the borough of Amsterdam-West.

The boundaries of the neighbourhood are Postjeswetering in the west and north, Kostverlorenvaart in the east, and Surinameplein in the south.

References

Amsterdam-West
Neighbourhoods of Amsterdam